Shih Chin-tien (born 1 August 1980) is a Taiwanese baseball player who currently plays for Uni-President Lions of Chinese Professional Baseball League. He played as third baseman for the Lions.

See also
Chinese Professional Baseball League
Uni-President Lions

References

1980 births
Living people
Uni-President 7-Eleven Lions players
Baseball players from Taichung